Soto ayam is a traditional Indonesian dish which uses ingredients such as chicken, lontong, noodles, and rice vermicelli. Soto ayam is popular in Singapore, Malaysia and Suriname. Turmeric is added as one of its main ingredients which makes the yellow chicken broth. It is one of the most popular variant of soto, a traditional soup commonly found in Indonesian cuisine. Besides chicken and vermicelli, it can also be served with hard-boiled eggs, slices of fried potatoes and Chinese celery leaves. Fried shallots are usually added as garnish. Coconut milk (santan) is also used as an additional ingredient. Koya, a powder of mixed prawn crackers with fried garlic, or sambal is a common topping. Krupuk or emping is also a common topping. Lalapan is usually served as a side dish.

Variations
Different regions have their own variation of this dish, for instance:
 Soto Ambengan, originated from Ambengan, Surabaya. Soto Ambengan is famous for its koya topping.
 Soto Banjar
 Soto Kudus
 Soto Medan
 Soto Lamongan
 Soto Lenthok
 Soto Semarang

See also 

Soto (food)
 List of chicken dishes
 List of Indonesian soups
 List of soups
Lontong
Ketupat
Noodle soup

References

External links

 Indonesian chicken noodle soup (soto ayam) recipe from SBS Australia

Indonesian soups
Indonesian cuisine
Malaysian cuisine
Singaporean cuisine
Malay cuisine
Street food in Indonesia
Noodle soups
Chicken soups